Historias de la Calle (Stories of the Street) is a studio album by Regional Mexican band Calibre 50. It was released in November 2015 under Andaluz Music.

Track listing

Charts

Weekly charts

Year-end charts

Certifications

Accolades

References

2015 albums